José António Conceiçāo Neto (5 October 1935 – 6 July 1999) was a Portuguese footballer who played as a defensive midfielder for Benfica. He was part of their European Cup victories in the 1960–61 and 1961–62 campaigns.

Honours
Benfica
Primeira Divisão: 1959–60, 1960–61, 1963–64, 1964–65
Taça de Portugal: 1958–59, 1961–62, 1963–64
European Cup: 1960–61, 1961–62
Intercontinental Cup runner-up: 1961

References

1935 births
1999 deaths
Portuguese footballers
People from Montijo, Portugal
Association football midfielders
S.L. Benfica footballers
S.C. Braga players
UEFA Champions League winning players
Sportspeople from Setúbal District